The National Shrine of Our Lady of Lourdes, better known as the Church of Lourdes de Retiro, is a Roman Catholic national shrine in Quezon City, Philippines. The church is administered by the Order of Friars Minor Capuchin of the Philippine Ecclesiastical Province and under the Vicariate of San Pedro Bautista of the Diocese of Cubao.

The original church was located in Intramuros until it was destroyed during the World War II. The venerated Marian image enshrined within dates from 1894 was hidden and spared during the bombing. The present church was completed and inaugurated in 1951. In 1997, it was declared as a national shrine by the Catholic Bishops' Conference of the Philippines.

Dedicated to the Blessed Virgin Mary as Our Lady of Lourdes,  Pope Francis granted a decree of Canonical coronation towards the image on 5 September 2019. The image was crowned on 22 August 2020.

History 

Eleven missionaries from Spain arrived in Manila on 13 May 1886 and stayed with the Franciscans in Intramuros. Six of the friars left while the remaining five continued to provide the spiritual needs of the area until they built the first Capuchin house in Gen Luna Street in Intramuros, Manila, opening it to the public on 8 May  1892.

Father Berardo de Cieza requested Manuel Flores to sculpt a statue of Our Lady of Lourdes later that year. A second image was sculpted by the same person with the guidance of Father Antonio of Valencia. In September 1897, Architect Federico Soler started the enlargement of the chapel with help from donations from a Mr. Moron. The new church dedicated to Our Lady of Lourdes was inaugurated on 3 February 1910.

When the World War II erupted, the image of Our Lady of Lourdes was kept in the sacristy of San Agustin Church (Manila). It was found intact after the war and was transferred to the chapel of the University of Santo Tomas and later moved to Santa Teresita Chapel in Mayon Street, Quezon City.

The Capuchins were able to obtain official authorization from the government on 9 February 1946 to the restore the church of Lourdes but decided to build a bigger church on an acquired 10,500 square meter lot located in Retiro Street, Quezon City. The construction of the new church started on 30 January 1950 by Engineer Marquez under the supervision of Father Bienvenido of Arbeiza as Custos.

On 10 February 1951, the image of Our Lady of Lourdes was transferred to the new church from the temporary shelter in Mayon Street. The church was inaugurated on 15 August  1951, by the Archbishop of Manila, Monsignor Reyes who officiated at the mass which was attended by many important people including Don Mariano Jesus Cuenco, President of the Philippine Senate, and Miss Gullon, daughter of the Spanish Ambassador.

On 24 January  1997, the church was declared National Shrine of Our Lady of Lourdes by the Catholic Bishops' Conference of the Philippines.

Since July 2022, the church is now holding fundraising campaigns for the repair of their pipe organ and upgrade of the church's audio systems.

Jurisdiction
The church is located on Kanlaon Street at the corner of N.S. Amoranto Street in Sta. Mesa Heights, La Loma, Quezon City. Its current boundaries include:
 G. Araneta Avenue (North Bound)
 Sta. Catalina Street (West Bound)
 A. Bonifacio Avenue (South Bound)
 Blumentritt Street (South Bound)
 Maria Clara Street (East Bound)

Six parishes have been erected within the former parochial jurisdiction of the shrine, namely:
 Our Lady of Perpetual Help, Manila (1951) 
 Santo Domingo, Quezon City (1972)
 Santa Teresita, Quezon City (1977)
 Santa Perpetua, Quezon City (1975) 
 San Roque, Manila (1987)
 Most Holy Redeemer, Quezon City (1994).

Priests

Current clergy
 Rev. Fr. Jefferson E. Agustin, O.F.M. Cap. (Parish Priest)
 Rev. Fr. Roque Aristotle Padama, O.F.M. Cap. (Assistant Parish Priest)

Prior clergy

Gallery

References

External links

 
 

Roman Catholic churches in Quezon City
Roman Catholic national shrines in the Philippines
Churches in the Roman Catholic Diocese of Cubao